Saitta is a surname. Notable people with the surname include:

Davide Saitta (born 1987), Italian volleyball player
Nancy Saitta, American attorney and judge

Italian-language surnames
Greek-language surnames